Mikko Hämäläinen (29 September 1891 – 22 August 1965) was a Finnish gymnast. He competed in nine events at the 1924 Summer Olympics.

References

External links
 

1891 births
1965 deaths
Finnish male artistic gymnasts
Olympic gymnasts of Finland
Gymnasts at the 1924 Summer Olympics
People from Mikkeli
Sportspeople from South Savo
20th-century Finnish people